Ukrainian female gymnasts have competed in every Olympics since 1996. A total of 23 female gymnasts have represented Ukraine at the Olympics, but the only medalist is Lilia Podkopayeva. Lilia Podkopayeva won a total of 3 medals at the 1996 Summer Olympics, and she was the first multiple Olympic medalist from Ukraine. In the team competition, Ukraine finished 5th in 1996 and 2000, 4th in 2004, and 11th in 2008. Ukraine was only allowed to send one gymnast to the 2012 Summer Olympics,  the 2016 Summer Olympics, and the 2020 Summer Olympics.

Gymnasts

Summer Olympics

Youth Olympic Games

Medalists

See also 
 List of Olympic male artistic gymnasts for Ukraine

References

Ukraine
gymnasts
Olympic